The DDZ Bridge over New Fork River is a Kingpost pony truss bridge located near Boulder, Wyoming, which carries Sublette County Road 136 across the New Fork River. The bridge was built in 1917 by Lincoln County's government, as Sublette County had not yet been formed. Unlike most truss bridges at the time, the bridge was built with timber trusses rather than steel; it is the only wooden two-span Kingpost truss bridge remaining in Wyoming. The bridge's construction is considered to be "the most sophisticated" of extant wooden truss bridges in the state.

The bridge was added to the National Register of Historic Places on February 22, 1985. It was one of several bridges added to the NRHP for its role in the history of Wyoming bridge construction.

See also
List of bridges documented by the Historic American Engineering Record in Wyoming

References

External links

Road bridges on the National Register of Historic Places in Wyoming
Bridges completed in 1917
Buildings and structures in Sublette County, Wyoming
King post truss bridges in the United States
Historic American Engineering Record in Wyoming
National Register of Historic Places in Sublette County, Wyoming
Wooden bridges in the United States